Kluane is an electoral district which returns a member (known as an MLA) to the Legislative Assembly of the Canadian territory of Yukon. It is named after Kluane National Park, which is within the riding. It is one of the Yukon's eight rural districts.

Kluane represents all Yukon communities and residents along the Alaska Highway west of Whitehorse and south to Alaska. This includes the communities of Haines Junction, Burwash Landing, Destruction Bay, Beaver Creek, and Mendenhall, as well as parts of the Ibex and Macpherson-Grizzly valleys. It is situated on the traditional territory of the Kluane First Nation, the Champagne and Aishihik First Nations, the White River First Nation, the Selkirk First Nation, and the Little Salmon/Carmacks First Nation.

The district was first created in 1974, when the Yukon Territorial Council was expanded from seven to 12 members as a prelude to the creation of the new legislative assembly. It is one of the oldest electoral districts in the Yukon and is presently bordered by the rural ridings of Klondike, Mayo-Tatchun, Lake Laberge, and Mount Lorne-Southern Lakes, as well as the Whitehorse ridings of Porter Creek North and Takhini-Kopper King.

Members of the Territorial Council / Legislative Assembly

Electoral results

2021 general election

2016 general election

|-

| Liberal
| Mathieya Alatini
| align="right"| 289
| align="right"| 37.1%
| align="right"| +8.1%

| NDP
| Sally Wright
| align="right"| 153
| align="right"| 19.2%
| align="right"| -9.8%
|-
! align=left colspan=3|Total
! align=right| 780
! align=right| 100.0%
! align=right| –
|}

2011 general election

|-

| NDP
| Eric Stinson
| align="right"| 220
| align="right"| 29.0%
| align="right"| +15.2%

| Liberal
| Timothy Cant
| align="right"| 219
| align="right"| 28.9%
| align="right"| -24.4%

|-
! align=left colspan=3|Total
! align=right| 759
! align=right| 100.0%
! align=right| –
|}

2006 general election

|-
 
|Liberal
|Gary McRobb
|align="right"| 317
|align="right"| 53.3%
|align="right"| +37.2%
|-

|-

|New Democratic Party
|Lillian Grubach-Hambrook
|align="right"| 82
|align="right"| 13.8%
|align="right"| -51.3%
|-

|Independent
|Freddy Hutter
|align="right"| 19
|align="right"| 3.2%
|align="right"| +3.2%
|-
! align=left colspan=3|Total
! align=right| 598
! align=right| 100.0%
! align=right| –
|}

2002 general election

|-

|New Democratic Party
|Gary McRobb
|align="right"| 442
|align="right"| 65.1%
|align="right"| +11.1%
|-

|-
 
|Liberal
|Paul Birkckel
|align="right"| 109
|align="right"| 16.1%
|align="right"| +0.7%
|-
! align=left colspan=3|Total
! align=right| 679
! align=right| 100.0%
! align=right| –
|}

2000 general election

|-

|New Democratic Party
|Gary McRobb
|align="right"| 405
|align="right"| 55.0%
|align="right"| +6.5%
|-

|-
 
|Liberal
|Gerald Brown
|align="right"| 113
|align="right"| 15.4%
|align="right"| -8.2%
|-
! align=left colspan=3|Total
! align=right| 736
! align=right| 100.0%
! align=right| –
|}

1996 general election

|-

|New Democratic Party
|Gary McRobb
|align="right"|364
|align="right"|48.5%
|align="right"| +8.4%
|-
 
|Liberal
|John Farynowski
|align="right"|177
|align="right"|23.6%
|align="right"| +23.6%
|-

|-
 
|Independent
|Bonnie Lock
|align="right"|66
|align="right"|8.8%
|align="right"| +8.8%
|-
! align=left colspan=3|Total
! align=right| 751
! align=right| 100.0%
! align=right| –
|}

1992 general election

|-

| NDP
| Wolf Riedl
| align="right"| 256
| align="right"| 40.1%
| align="right"| -2.5%
|-
! align=left colspan=3|Total
! align=right| 638
! align=right| 100.0%
! align=right| –
|}
 The Yukon Progressive Conservative Party re-branded itself as the Yukon Party before the 1992 election.

1989 general election

|-

|-

|New Democratic Party
|Ron Chambers
|align="right"| 183
|align="right"| 42.6%
|align="right"| +18.7%
|-
 
|Liberal
|Bill Woolsey
|align="right"| 37
|align="right"| 8.6%
|align="right"| -7.3%
|-
! align=left colspan=3|Total
! align=right| 430
! align=right| 100.0%
! align=right| –
|}

1985 general election

|-

|-

|New Democratic Party
|Scott Gilbert
|align="right"| 95
|align="right"| 23.9%
|align="right"| -19.4%
|-
 
|Liberal
|Tony Stanevicus
|align="right"| 63
|align="right"| 15.9%
|align="right"| +12.1%
|-
! align=left colspan=3|Total
! align=right| 397
! align=right| 100.0%
! align=right| –
|}

1982 general election

|-

|-

|New Democratic Party
|Dave Joe
|align="right"| 196
|align="right"| 43.3%
|align="right"| +43.3%
|-
 
|Liberal
|Alice McGuire
|align="right"| 16
|align="right"| 3.5%
|align="right"| -44.8%
|-
! align=left colspan=3|Total
! align=right| 453
! align=right| 100.0%
! align=right| –
|}

1978 general election

|-
 
|Liberal
|Alice McGuire
|align="right"| 188
|align="right"| 48.3%
|align="right"| –
|-

|-

|Independent
|John Livesey
|align="right"| 49
|align="right"| 12.6%
|align="right"| –
|-
! align=left colspan=3|Total
! align=right| 389
! align=right| 100.0%
! align=right| –
|}

Partisan politics introduced into the territory

1974 general election

|-

|Independent
|Hilda Watson
|align="right"| 123
|align="right"| 28.8%
|align="right"| –
|-

|Independent
|John Livesey
|align="right"| 106
|align="right"| 24.8%
|align="right"| –
|-

|Independent
|Bob MacKinnon
|align="right"| 97
|align="right"| 22.7%
|align="right"| –
|-

|Independent
|Ray Jackson
|align="right"| 57
|align="right"| 13.3%
|align="right"| –
|-

|Independent
|Jack Brewster
|align="right"| 43
|align="right"| 10.1%
|align="right"| –
|-
! align=left colspan=3|Total
! align=right| 427
! align=right| 100.0%
! align=right| –
|}

References

External links 
 Kluane - Yukon Votes 2006. Retrieved May 22, 2009.

Yukon territorial electoral districts
1974 establishments in Yukon